The France women's national under-20 basketball team is a national basketball team of France, administered by the French Federation of Basketball. It represents the country in women's international under-20 basketball competitions.

FIBA U20 Women's European Championship participations

FIBA Under-21 World Championship for Women participations

See also
France women's national basketball team
France women's national under-19 basketball team

References

External links
Archived records of France team participations

Men's national under-20 basketball teams
Women's national under-20 basketball teams